Port HHZ was a shore establishment of the Royal Navy during the Second World War. It was based at Loch Cairnbawn, Scotland, and was established in 1942.

The base was heavily involved in the training for the X-Craft operations (Operation Source) to sink the German battleship Tirpitz. Capital ships of the Home fleet acted as target ships at Port HHZ. The Boom Defence organisation were also heavily involved in surrounding these ships with nets and providing net defences and equipment for the trials.

Special security measures at Port HHZ were also increased from 1 September. No leave was allowed, and only specially selected officers and ratings were permitted to leave the area. All ships present were retained in the port until the completion of the operation.

References

Royal Navy bases in Scotland
Royal Navy shore establishments